Mrigaya may refer to:

Mrigayaa, a 1976 Hindi language film directed by Mrinal Sen
Mrigaya (1989 film), a 1989 Malayalam language film directed by I. V. Sasi